"Mama's Song" is a song recorded by American country music singer Carrie Underwood, co-written by her along with Kara DioGuardi, Marti Frederiksen, and Luke Laird. It was released in September 2010 as the fourth and final single from her third studio album, Play On. These songwriters also wrote her previous single, "Undo It".

Underwood performed this song on the 44th CMA Awards on November 10, 2010. The song was nominated for Best Country Solo Performance at the 54th Grammy Awards.

Content
The song is a ballad where the female narrator sings to her mother, telling her to let her go and not to worry as the daughter moves out and begins her own life as the bride of the man she loves.

Critical reception
Stephen Thomas Erlewine of Allmusic described the song as "sticky" and "tacky." Sean Daly of the St. Petersburg Times compared it unfavorably to "Change" on the same album, saying that both were "too precious, too preachy." Slant Magazine reviewer Jonathan Keefe described the song more favorably in his review of the album, saying that it had cliché lyrics but praising Underwood's "understated vocal" as well as the comparatively softer production. In a more positive review, Bobby Peacock of Roughstock gave it three-and-a-half stars out of five, saying that she "proves yet again that she can just sing without having to reach for the rafters on every note, and the production is agreeably mellow and acoustic."

Music video
The official music video for "Mama's Song" premiered on VEVO on September 24, 2010. It features both Underwood's husband Mike Fisher, and her mother Carole. It was filmed in Nashville, and was directed by Shaun Silva. It tells the story of a woman who meets her true love and moves away from her mom.

Chart performance
In October 2009, in advance of the album's release, "Mama's Song" charted at number 77 on the Billboard Hot 100 and number 68 on the Canadian Hot 100. It was the first of three promotional singles from the album. On the Hot Country Songs charts dated for the week ending September 4, 2010, it entered at number 55. It has also re-entered the Billboard Hot 100 at number 87 upon its release as an official single and has reached a new peak of 56. It is one of Underwood's singles to reach the Hot 100 that has charted outside the top 50, with "Love Wins" and "Drinking Alone." On the week of January 17, 2011 it peaked at number two on Hot Country Songs and became Underwood's third single to peak at number two.

Commercial performance
As a promotional single (before the release of Play On):

United States: 39,000

As a confirmed single (after the release of Play On):

United States: 442,000

The song has been certified Platinum by the RIAA.

Year-end charts

Certifications

Awards and nominations

2011 Inspirational Country Music (ICM) Awards

|-
| align="center"|2011 ||align="center"| "Mama's Song" ||align="center"| Inspirational Mainstream Song || 
|-
| align="center"|2011 ||align="center"| "Mama's Song" ||align="center"| Inspirational Music Video ||

2011 BMI Awards

|-
| align="center"|2011 ||align="center"| "Mama's Song" ||align="center"| Songwriter of the Year ||

2011 American Country Awards

|-
| align="center"|2011 ||align="center"| "Mama's Song" ||align="center"| Female Single of the Year || 
|-
| align="center"|2011 ||align="center"| "Mama's Song" ||align="center"| Female Music Video of the Year ||

54th Grammy Awards

|-
| align="center"|2011 ||align="center"| "Mama's Song" ||align="center"| Best Country Solo Performance ||

Release history

References

2010 singles
2009 songs
Country ballads
2010s ballads
Carrie Underwood songs
Songs about mothers
Songs written by Kara DioGuardi
Songs written by Carrie Underwood
Arista Nashville singles
Songs written by Luke Laird
Music videos directed by Shaun Silva
Song recordings produced by Mark Bright (record producer)
Songs written by Marti Frederiksen